Stass Paraskos (17 March 1933 – 4 March 2014) was an artist from Cyprus, although much of his life was spent teaching and working in England.

Early life
Paraskos was born in Anaphotia, a village near the city of Larnaca, Cyprus in 1933, the second of six sons of an impoverished peasant farmer. He went to England in 1953, working first as a pot washer and waiter in the ABC Tearoom in London's Tottenham Court Road, and then moving to the city of Leeds, in the north of England to become a cook in his brother's newly opened Greek restaurant. The restaurant became a popular haunt of the local art students who encouraged Paraskos to enrol for classes at Leeds College of Art (later Leeds Arts University). Despite not having the usual entry qualifications to start a college course, Paraskos was spotted by the college's inspirational Head of Fine Art, Harry Thubron, who allowed Paraskos to enrol without the usual entry requirements. There he became close friends with artists such as Dennis Creffield, Terry Frost and Wilhelmina Barns-Graham, with Frost and Barns-Graham persuading Paraskos to move to St Ives in Cornwall in 1959. In St Ives Paraskos shared a studio with Barns-Graham until he returned to Leeds in 1961 and began teaching at Leeds College of Art.

Obscenity Trial
In 1966 Paraskos was involved in a notorious court case, which became known as the Stass Paraskos Obscenity Trial, in which it was alleged he displayed paintings that were 'lewd and obscene', in contravention of the Vagrancy Act 1838. The court case was one of a number of important legal challenges to the freedom of the arts in the 1960s and 70s, starting with the Lady Chatterley trial in 1960, and ending with the Oz magazine trial in 1971. Despite luminaries of the art world speaking in Paraskos's defence, including Sir Herbert Read and Norbert Lynton, and messages of support from Britain's Home Secretary Roy Jenkins, Paraskos lost the trial and was fined five pounds.

The curator of a retrospective exhibition of Paraskos's work held in Leeds in 2009, Terence Jones, was quoted as saying: "Ironically the painting in question now hangs in the Tate. When you see it, you do wonder what all the fuss was about. It's quite an expressionistic piece in which you can see, just, a woman holding a man's penis, but it is extremely tame when compared to what has happened in the art world since then."

Following this Paraskos was invited in 1967 to take part in a group exhibition, Fantasy and Figuration, alongside Pat Douthwaite, Herbert Kitchen and Ian Dury at the Institute of Contemporary Arts in London. Dury was later to become a close friend as they both began teaching at Canterbury College of Art in 1970.  Paraskos became the last British artist to be successfully prosecuted for obscenity under the Vagrancy Act 1838. An exhibition recreating the 1966 Leeds exhibition was staged at the Tetley Arts Centre in Leeds in 2016 to mark the fiftieth anniversary of the original exhibition and prosecution, and in 2021 the trial featured in the BBC television documentary, Forbidden Art, presented by Mary Beard.

Teaching career
Paraskos started teaching part-time at Leeds College of Art (Leeds Arts University) in the mid-1960s after returning from St Ives in Cornwall. He also taught at Leicester Polytechnic before becoming a lecturer at Canterbury College of Art (University for Creative Arts) in 1969.

When Canterbury College of Art was renamed Kent Institute of Art & Design, Paraskos was appointed a Senior Lecturer in Fine Art and then Head of Painting, before returning to Cyprus in 1989 to run the Cyprus College of Art with his daughter Margaret Paraskos. Using his connections in the British art world, Paraskos was able to bring a large number of well-known international artists to the Cyprus College of Art, including Anthony Caro, Dennis Creffield, Jennifer Durrant, Terry Frost, Clive Head, Michael Kidner, Mali Morris, Euan Uglow, Rachel Whiteread and others, as well as many hundreds of art students from Britain and elsewhere, resulting in what John Cornall, writing in The London Magazine in 1996, called the discernable influence of Cypriot elements in British art during the period.

These visits by internationally recognised artists resulted in the Cyprus College of Art being held up as one of the cultural highlights of Cyprus by several presidents of Cyprus and other government ministers during the 1970s and 1980s. However, according to Parakos's son, the art historian Michael Paraskos, Stass Paraskos believed he has deliberately snubbed by the academics at the University of Cyprus, after its foundation in 1989. Although Paraskos had received numerous assurances from Cyprus government ministers during the 1970s and 1980s that the Cyprus College of Art would form the nucleus of a new Faculty of Fine Art at the future University of Cyprus, on its creation he found himself sidelined by the new University authorities. According to Michael Paraskos, his father saw this as a personal betrayal by the government authorities, which pushed Stass Paraskos into taking an even more anti-establishment line in his art, writings and running of the Cyprus College of Art.

Style and influences
Paraskos's style of painting is figurative but non-naturalistic, and he uses bright colours to describe scenes which often seem rooted in his childhood in Cyprus. He is also influenced by the Byzantine church art of Cyprus, and modern masters, such as Paul Gauguin and Henri Matisse. Works include Pagan Spring in the State Gallery of Contemporary Art in Nicosia, Lovers and Romances in the Tate Gallery in London, and Bathing, in the collection of the Arts Council of England.

According to Dominique Auzias and Jean-Paul Labourdette Paraskos's paintings 'illustrate Cypriot rural life, the tormented history of the island, love, life, death, always in a lyrical, romantic mode.'

Despite primarily being a painter, in 1992 he began work on an ambitious sculpture wall, in the village of Lempa, on the west coast of Cyprus. This wall is made of found and recycled everyday objects, and comprises a mixture of abstract and figurative forms, including a King Kong-sized gorilla, a pigmy elephant and a giant pair of welcoming hands. The wall is twenty metres long and up to four metres high, and forms a sculpture garden enclosing the studios of the Cyprus College of Art.

Paraskos was consistently a political artist, with left-wing, and later anarchist, sympathies. A member of the Communist Party of Cyprus (AKEL) in his youth, he used his art to look at subjects such as political and social oppression, the rights of women and the horrors of war in Cyprus and the Middle East. This political activism went beyond his painting too, with frequent articles by Stass appearing in Cypriot newspapers attacking what he saw as the destruction of Cypriot culture, society and the environment by capitalism. Of the European Union-backed international arts festival, Manifesta 6, scheduled to be staged in Cyprus in 2006, he wrote of it being 'a capitalist plot to hijack and destroy what is uniquely Cypriot in our culture and replace it with a bland globalism.'

Artistic career

Following his controversial exhibition in 1966 at the Leeds Institute Gallery, which was raided by the local police, Paraskos was invited in 1967 to take part in a group exhibition, Fantasy and Figuration, alongside Pat Douthwaite, Herbert Kitchen and Ian Dury at the Institute of Contemporary Arts in London.

His first exhibition in Cyprus followed a year later, at the Four Lanterns Hotel in Larnaca after which he exhibited regularly in galleries in both the United Kingdom and Cyprus. His published resume also lists exhibitions in Greece, the United States, Brazil, India, and Denmark.

In 2003 Paraskos was the subject of a book by the art historian Norbert Lynton, published by the Orage Press. His work is represented in the State Collections of Cyprus, the National Gallery of Greece, the Collection of the Arts Council of England, Leeds University Art Collection, Leeds City Art Gallery and the Tate Gallery (Tate Britain), London.

In 2008 he was awarded an honorary doctorate by the University of Bolton for his services to art and art education.

In 2017 he was the subject of a major exhibition at Pafos Art Gallery in Cyprus as part of the city's celebrations as European Capital of Culture.

Writings
Paraskos was a prolific writer, writing numerous articles, predominantly in Greek, for newspapers in Cyprus, collections of poems and books on Greek mythology, including Cyprus of Copper in 1969, and Aphrodite: The Mythology of Cyprus in 1981.

In the preface to Paraskos's book Aphrodite: The Mythology of Cyprus the late George Thomas, 1st Viscount Tonypandy, a frequent traveller to Cyprus commented: "Greek mythology provides an eternal fascination.... Stass Paraskos, one of Cyprus' most distinguished artists provides in this book an exciting recital of the influence Greek mythology has brought to bear on Greek Cypriot development."

Paraskos's The Mythology of Cyprus was published in Greek and Turkish translations in 2018.

Death
Paraskos died on 4 March 2014 in Paphos, Cyprus of septicaemia caused by diabetes-related gangrene in his legs. He was 81 years old. A street in the village of Lempa, the current location of the Cyprus College of Art, has been named after him in his memory.

See also
 Margaret Paraskos, his daughter, and an artist

References

External links
 Official website for Stass Paraskos
  Tate Gallery Catalogue
  The Guardian newspaper (UK)
  ArtUK Public Collection Art Listings in Britain
 Catalogue for exhibition at Pafos 2017: European Capital of Culture, March 2017

1933 births
2014 deaths
20th-century British painters
British male painters
21st-century British painters
Greek Cypriot artists
Modern painters
St Ives artists
Academics of Leeds Arts University
Alumni of Leeds Arts University
Obscenity controversies in painting
Cypriot emigrants to the United Kingdom
20th-century British male artists
21st-century British male artists